The statue of Kurt Christoph Graf von Schwerin is a bronze sculpture by August Kiss at Zietenplatz in Berlin, Germany.

References

Bronze sculptures in Germany
Mitte
Statues in Berlin
Outdoor sculptures in Berlin
Sculptures of men in Germany
Statues in Germany